Huang Hong (born 1980) is a Chinese team handball player. Playing on the Chinese national team, she competed at the 2008 Summer Olympics in Beijing, where China placed sixth.

References

External links

1980 births
Living people
Chinese female handball players
Olympic handball players of China
Handball players at the 2008 Summer Olympics
Sportspeople from Anhui
Asian Games medalists in handball
Handball players at the 2006 Asian Games
Handball players at the 2010 Asian Games
Handball players at the 2014 Asian Games
Asian Games gold medalists for China
Medalists at the 2010 Asian Games